Sólveig Arnarsdóttir (born 26 January 1973) is an Icelandic actress. She is known for her performances in Stella í orlofi, Let Me Fall, Trapped, and Katla.

Sólveig is the daughter of Icelandic actor Arnar Jónsson and Icelandic actress and politician Þórhildur Þorleifsdóttir. She graduated from the Ernst Busch Academy of Dramatic Arts in Berlin, Germany. She worked on stage at the Icelandic National Theatre, the Icelandic Opera, and Maxim Gorki Theatre in Berlin.

Selected filmography

Film

Television

References

External links
 

1973 births
Living people
Sólveig Arnarsdóttir
Sólveig Arnarsdóttir
Ernst Busch Academy of Dramatic Arts alumni
Sólveig Arnarsdóttir
Sólveig Arnarsdóttir